The following is a list of winners of the Golden Calf for best music at the NFF. This category has been awarded since 2003.

 2022 Ella van der Woude - Moloch
 2021 Gino Taihuttu - The East
 2020 Rui Reis Maia, Jasper Boeke and Diederik Rijpstra - The Promise of Pisa
 2019 Rutger Reinders - Dirty God
 2018 Harry de Wit - Cobain
 2017 Junkie XL - Brimstone
 2016 Alex Simu - Beyond Sleep
 2015 Palmbomen - Prins 
 2014 Christiaan Verbeek - Helium
 2013 New Cool Collective - Toegetakeld door de liefde
 2012 Helge Slikker - Kauwboy
 2011 Het paleis van boem - The Gang of Oss
 2010 Ernst Reijseger - C’est Déjà L’été
 2009 Perquisite - Carmen van het Noorden
 2008 Michiel Borstlap - Tiramisu
 2007 Vincent van Warmerdam - Kicks
 2006 Giorgio Tuinfort, Bart van de Lisdonk, Big Orange & Earforce - Bolletjes Blues
 2005 Paul M. van Brugge - Alias Kurban Saïd
 2004 Mark van Platen - Kees De Jongen
 2003 Fons Merkies - Boy Ecury

Sources
 Golden Calf Awards (Dutch)
 NFF Website

Best Music
Film music awards